"How Much Love" is a popular song from 1977 by the British singer Leo Sayer.  It was the third of three single releases from Sayer's 1976 album, Endless Flight.  The song was co-written by Sayer with Barry Mann.

The song became an international Top 10 hit.  Although it reached only number 17 on the U.S. Billboard Hot 100, it hit number 9 on the U.S. Cashbox Top 100, and number 10 in the UK.

"How Much Love" was a much bigger hit in Canada, where it peaked at number 4 and was the 57th biggest hit of 1977.  It also reached the Top 10 on the Canadian AC chart.

Chicago radio station WLS, which gave "How Much Love" airplay, ranked the song as the 62nd biggest hit of 1977. It reached as high as number 5 on their weekly singles survey.

Personnel
Leo Sayer - vocals
Gene Page - string arrangements
Larry Carlton - rhythm guitar
Chuck Rainey - bass
Richard Tee - piano
Steve Gadd - drums  
Ray Parker Jr. - lead guitar
Bobbye Hall - percussion

Chart performance

Weekly charts

Year-end charts

Cover version
"How Much Love" was covered by Maxine Nightingale on her 1977 LP Night Life. It was also included as the B-side of one of the singles from the LP.

References

External links
 Lyrics of this song
 

1977 songs
Leo Sayer songs
1977 singles
Warner Records singles
Song recordings produced by Richard Perry
Songs written by Leo Sayer
Songs written by Barry Mann
Maxine Nightingale songs